Subonoba turqueti is a species of minute sea snail, a marine gastropod mollusk or micromollusk in the family Rissoidae. The maximum recorded shell length is 3.05 mm. Minimum recorded depth is 5 m. Maximum recorded depth is 167 m.

References

 Ponder W. F. (1983) Rissoaform gastropods from the Antarctic and sub-Antarctic. The Eatoniellidae, Rissoidae, Barleeidae, Cingulopsidae, Orbitestellidae and Rissoellidae (Mollusca: Gastropoda) of Signy Island, South Orkney Islands, with a review of the Antarctic and sub-Antarctic (excluding southern South America and the New Zealand sub-Antarctic islands) species. British Antarctic Survey, Scientific Reports 108: 1-96.

Rissoidae
Gastropods described in 1905